is a former Japanese football player.

Playing career
Nomoto was born in Niigata on June 25, 1983. After graduating from high school, he joined J1 League club JEF United Ichihara in 2002. However he could not play at all in the match. In 2005, he moved to Albirex Niigata Singapore. In 2006, he returned to Japan and joined J2 League club Consadole Sapporo. However he could not play at all in the match. In July 2006, he moved to Regional Leagues club New Wave Kitakyushu. In October, he moved to Regional Leagues club Fagiano Okayama. He played many matches and Fagiano was promoted to Japan Football League (JFL) from 2008 and J2 from 2009. However his opportunity to play decreased from 2010. In July 2011, he moved to JFL club V-Varen Nagasaki. In 2012, he moved to JFL club Blaublitz Akita. He played many matches as regular player in 2012. He retired end of 2012 season.

Club statistics

References

External links

1983 births
Living people
Association football people from Niigata Prefecture
Japanese footballers
J1 League players
J2 League players
Japan Football League players
JEF United Chiba players
Hokkaido Consadole Sapporo players
Giravanz Kitakyushu players
Fagiano Okayama players
V-Varen Nagasaki players
Blaublitz Akita players
Association football defenders